Mutarule is a village near Luberizi, in South Kivu, Democratic Republic of the Congo. It is noted for a number of violent incidents since the 2010s.

History 
In August 2013, eight residents of Mutarule were killed in an attack by unidentified armed men.

Mutarele was scene to the 2014 South Kivu attack in which 35 villagers were killed.

References 
Populated places in South Kivu